The Owyhee Mountains are a mountain range in Owyhee County, Idaho and Malheur County, Oregon.

Mahogany Mountain and the associated volcanic craters of the Lake Owyhee volcanic field are in the Owyhee Mountains of Oregon just east of the Owyhee Reservoir on the Owyhee River.

The southeastern end of the range including the old mining area west of Silver City is referred to as the Silver City Range. The area was active in the late 1880s. In the 1970s mining began again with the development of open pit silver–gold mines on De Lamar Mountain.

References

Further reading
 Adams, Mildretta (1986) Sagebrush Post Offices, A History of the Owyhee Country, Idaho State University Press 

Mountain ranges of Idaho
Mountain ranges of Oregon
Landforms of Owyhee County, Idaho
Mountain ranges of Malheur County, Oregon
Owyhee Desert
Owyhee River
Mountain ranges of the Great Basin